Wonka is a surname. Notable people with the surname include:

 Pavel Wonka, Czechoslovak dissident, victim of communist terror
 Salif Wonka, French rapper

Fictional characters

Willy Wonka, a fictional character in Roald Dahl's books Charlie and the Chocolate Factory and Charlie and the Great Glass Elevator

See also

Wonka (disambiguation)